The Look is the seventh album by American R&B group Shalamar, released in 1983 on the SOLAR label. It is the last Shalamar album to feature the classic line-up of Jeffrey Daniel, Howard Hewett and Jody Watley, as both Daniel and Watley would leave the group shortly before its release. The album features the Grammy nominated hit single "Dead Giveaway".

The Look peaked at No. 13 on the R&B chart and No. 79 on the Billboard pop chart. Like Shalamar's previous album, Friends, it was more successful in the United Kingdom, where it reached No. 7. The Look was certified Gold in the United States and Gold in the UK.

Track listing

Charts

Singles

References

External links
 Shalamar-The Look at Discogs

1983 albums
Shalamar albums
SOLAR Records albums
Albums produced by Leon Sylvers III